Dallas Superstars are a duo of Finnish record producers. Relatively unknown outside their home country,  they have had international success with the club track, "Helium". Dallas Superstars are a couple of Finnish record makers named Heikki "Bostik" Liimatainen and Jaakko "JS16" Salovaara. Generally obscure external their nation of origin they have had worldwide accomplishment with club exemplary Helium, a move track which was delivered in 2002. The achievement of this single (which came to #3 on the Finnish move outline) provoked further arrivals of Fast Driving, Ready To Go, I Feel Love (a revamp of the Donna Summer exemplary) and Crazy, and the collection from which these tracks came. In 2006 they delivered their subsequent collection called Higher State.

"Helium"
The Dallas Superstar's first single was a dance track entitled "Helium", released in 2002. The success of this single (which reached #3 on the Finnish dance chart, and #64 in the UK Singles Chart) prompted further releases of "Fast Driving", "Ready To Go", "I Feel Love" (a cover version of the Donna Summer song) and "Crazy", and the album from which these tracks came.

Flash
Flash (2004) was the Dallas Superstar's first album, which was released only in Finland and Sweden. The release of another  album Higher State was announced from the official website in September 2005. The first single from Higher State was "Fine Day".

Live
The Dallas Superstars live performances mostly consist of DJ sets, although they have played small gigs consisting of purely their own material.

References

External links
Official Site 

Finnish electronic music groups
Finnish musical duos